Al-Baath Stadium is a multi-purpose stadium located in Jableh, Syria.  It is currently used mostly for football matches. It serves as a home ground of Jableh SC. The stadium holds 10,000 spectators. The venue was opened in 1990 and completely renovated between 2004 and 2006.

See also 
List of stadiums

Baath
Multi-purpose stadiums in Syria